Pimp That Snack is a website which received media attention during April 2006.  The website features guides on creating giant versions of everyday snacks.  Articles are submitted by members of the public and a voting system allows people to rate each pimp from 1 to 100.

Initially known as 'Pimp My Snack', the site changed name during May 2006 following contact from Viacom legal representatives, who claimed that the name of the website was an infringement on trademarks relating to their Pimp My Ride television program.

The website creator Pete Wilcock, from Cheadle Hulme, Stockport, Greater Manchester, has been interviewed on national radio, newspapers, and popular magazines such as Zoo, Nuts, and Loaded.

On 2 August 2006, the Channel 4 food programme The F-Word did a segment on the website.  Food critic Giles Coren "pimped" a giant Jaffa cake. With an audience of 6 million people in the UK, this was a substantial plug for the website and the resulting traffic caused some difficulty keeping the site online.

More recently the website has been featured on Annie Mac's BBC Radio 1 programme, as well as BBC Two's Ready Steady Cook programme on 3 November 2006 and on Channel 4's Homemade programme on 17 February 2007.

The site was featured on BBC Radio 5 Live on 7 February 2010.

See also
 List of websites about food and drink

Sources

External links
Pimp That Snack

British cooking websites
Internet properties established in 2006